Arnold V de Looz, (died August 22, 1327) was Count of Loon  from 1279 to 1323 and Count of Chiny (Arnulf III) from 1299 to 1310. He was the son of John I, Count of Looz and Mathilde Jülich.

Biography

He helped Richardis Gelderland, his widow maternal grandfather, Henri, Count of Luxembourg and Renaud I, Count of Gelderland, fight Siegfried von Westerburg, archbishop of Cologne. Taken prisoner, he had to pay a ransom to be freed.

He was forced to deal with Isabelle de Conde, widow of his father in 1281 and had to assign a dower, and give Warcq, Agimont and Givet to his half-brothers John and Jacquemin. In turn, they give up their rights to the county of Loon. This is the only condition that the parents of Marguerite one hand, and his uncle Nicolas II de Conde on the other hand, consent to marriage.

In 1288, he commanded a corps of the army of John I, Duke of Brabant, and contributed much to the victory on June 5 in the famous Battle of Worringen (on the Rhine), which ended the War of Limburg succession between Renaud, Count of Gelderland, husband of Ermingarde heiress, Duchess of Limburg (+ 1283), and the Duke of Brabant.

he ranks in the war of Awans and Waroux between families Waroux and Awans, from 1297 to 1335, on the side of the bishops of Liege, Hugues de Chalon (from 1396-1301) and Adolph II of La Marck (1313 to 1344), Haspengouw dependent on these princes. He was appointed regent Mambourg or Liège after the death of Adolf II of Waldeck (1302).

In 1299, death without his uncle's son Louis V, he inherited Chiny (is this uncle who organized in 1285 the famous Tournament Chauvency, Jacques Bretel celebrated).

In 1312, the death of the bishop of Liege Bar Thiebaut prompted him to return to Liege, but faces revolt of the bourgeoisie. The principality was ravaged and saw the excommunication of the count.

He competed at the famous peace of Fexhe, signed June 18, 1316, which establishes the sharing of power between the prince, the clergy, the nobility and the cities of the principality of Liège and its capital, Liège. It was formal and legal recognition of the division of government between the prince and the country.

Both in Liege and in Brabant he supported the nobility and opposed the common revolts.

Towards the end of his reign, he gradually withdrew its counties. In 1313, he sold the County of Chiny to his son Louis, then in 1323 the county of Loon.

He died August 22, 1327 and is buried at the Abbey of Averbode.

Marriage and family 
He married June 21, 1280 Marguerite Vianden († 1316), Lady of Perwez and Grimbergen, daughter of Philip I, Count of Vianden, and Marie de Louvain, and had:
 Louis IV († 1336), Count of Loon and Chiny,
 Jean, who died young,
 Arnold,
 Mathilde (1282 † 1313), married to Godefroy II, Lord of Heinsberg, Blankenberge and WASSEMBERG (1331), in which she dowry Fortress Vogelsanck (the current town of Heusden-Zolder, Belgium Limburg) with areas of Zwilre, Sonhoven and Hautaets and parent Thierry Heinsberg, Count of Loon and Chiny,
 Mary, married first husband Gilles Berthout, confessed Mechelen, died childless in 1310; she married second husband Gerard Diest, lord of Antwerp; she dies without children shortly after,
 Jeanne, lady Quaetbeke, Arnulf of widow Wesemael, lord of Bergen op Zom of Woude and Quaetbeke, died around 1312; she then married William of Oreye, to be lord of Rummen (Rumigny) by donation of Louis IV of Loon in 1331
 Margaret, wife of William de Duras, told of Neufchatel, Esquire; his father gave him as dowry the castle and lordship of Duras;
 as he survives his half-brothers Counts of Chiny, it brings it to his possessions county, and in 1299 added to his titles that of Count of Chiny.

References

1327 deaths